The Communauté d'agglomération de Sophia Antipolis (CASA) is the communauté d'agglomération, an intercommunal structure, centred on the city of Antibes. It is located in the Alpes-Maritimes department, in the Provence-Alpes-Côte d'Azur region, southeastern France. It was created in 2002, and takes its name from the technology park Sophia Antipolis. Its area is 482.8 km2. Its population was 177,077 in 2018, of which 72,915 in Antibes.

Composition
The communauté d'agglomération consists of the following 24 communes:

Antibes
Le Bar-sur-Loup
Bézaudun-les-Alpes
Biot
Bouyon
Caussols
Châteauneuf-Grasse
Cipières
La Colle-sur-Loup
Conségudes
Courmes
Coursegoules
Les Ferres
Gourdon
Gréolières
Opio
La Roque-en-Provence
Roquefort-les-Pins
Le Rouret
Saint-Paul-de-Vence
Tourrettes-sur-Loup
Valbonne
Vallauris
Villeneuve-Loubet

Conseil de Communauté
The Council of Communities is made up of 50 delegates from the above communes.

Jurisdiction 
The CASA has for mandatory areas of jurisdiction:
 Economic development,
 Land management,
 Environmental protection,
 Town political structures.

It is to oversee as well:
 Organization of common transport problems,
 Sanitation collection and treatment,
 Assessment, protection, and economic impact of the local environment,
 The creation, management and assessment of cultural and sporting organizations across the communes.

Activities of the CASA 
Areas over which the CASA has shared jurisdiction:
 Aeroports,
 Fisheries and shellfish cultivation,
 Vineyard Cultivation,
 Wine and Spirits production,
 Thermal Energy production,
 Tourism.

See also 
 Urban community of Nice Côte d'Azur

References

External links 
 CASA

Sophia Antipolis
Sophia Antipolis